The United States District Court for the Eastern District of Virginia (in case citations, E.D. Va.) is one of two United States district courts serving the Commonwealth of Virginia. It has jurisdiction over the Northern Virginia, Hampton Roads, and Richmond metro areas and surrounding locations with courthouses located in Alexandria, Norfolk, Richmond and Newport News (whose judges are shared with Norfolk).

Appeals from the Eastern District of Virginia are taken to the United States Court of Appeals for the Fourth Circuit (except for patent claims and claims against the U.S. government under the Tucker Act, which are appealed to the Federal Circuit).

History 
The United States District Court for the District of Virginia was one of the original 13 courts established by the Judiciary Act of 1789, on September 24, 1789.

On February 13, 1801, the Judiciary Act of 1801, divided Virginia into three judicial districts: the District of Virginia, which included the counties west of the Tidewater and south of the Rappahannock River; the District of Norfolk, which included the Tidewater counties south of the Rappahannock; and the District of Potomac, which included the counties north and east of the Rappahannock as well as Maryland counties along the Potomac. Just over a year later, on March 8, 1802, the Judiciary Act of 1801 was repealed and Virginia became a single district again, effective July 1, 1802.

At that time, West Virginia was still part of Virginia, and was encompassed in Virginia's Western District, while the Eastern District essentially covered what is now the entire state of Virginia.

During the 1960s, Judge Albert V. Bryan Jr. ran the Alexandria court, often ruled cases on the spot after motions were argued. The court earned the nickname of "rocket docket" for the speed and efficiency for which it processes its cases. Since 1997, the court has processed civil cases the fastest of the 94 federal districts, and eighth fastest in dealing with criminal cases. Courts at Richmond are located in the Spottswood W. Robinson III and Robert R. Merhige Jr. Federal Courthouse, having previously been held in the historic Lewis F. Powell Jr. United States Courthouse.

Jurisdiction 

The Eastern District of Virginia court's jurisdiction covers slightly over six million people, comprising approximately 85% of the state's population. Its jurisdiction is grouped into four geographic divisions:

Alexandria Division 

The Alexandria Division covers the counties of suburban Washington, D.C.: Arlington, Fairfax, Fauquier, Loudoun, Prince William, and Stafford, and includes the independent cities of Alexandria, Fairfax City, Manassas, Manassas Park, Falls Church, and Fredericksburg.

Richmond Division 
The Richmond Division comprises the counties of Amelia, Brunswick, Caroline, Charles City, Chesterfield, Dinwiddie, Essex, Goochland, Greensville, Hanover, Henrico, James City, King and Queen, King George, King William, Lancaster, Lunenburg,  Mecklenburg, Middlesex, New Kent, Northumberland, Nottoway, Powhatan, Prince Edward, Prince George, Richmond, Spotsylvania, Surry, Sussex, and Westmoreland, as well as independent cities such as Colonial Heights.

Norfolk Division 
Norfolk Division includes the counties of Accomack, Northampton, Isle of Wight, Southampton, and independent cities such as Chesapeake, Norfolk, Portsmouth, Suffolk, and Virginia Beach.

Newport News Division 
The Newport News Division includes the counties of Gloucester, Mathews, York County, James City County, Virginia and cities such as Hampton, Newport News, Poquoson, and Williamsburg.

United States Attorney 
 the U.S. Attorney for the Eastern District of Virginia is Jessica D. Aber, serving as prosecution for criminal cases brought by the federal government, and representing the United States in civil cases in the court. The U.S. Attorney's office also manages the Project Safe Neighborhoods program within the district to reduce gun violence (part of a nationwide program), and is involved with federal initiatives on drug trafficking, terrorism, cybercrime, and the prevention/combating of elder care abuse.

Current judges 
:

Former judges

Chief judges

Succession of seats

Notable cases 
The Eastern District of Virginia has handled many notable cases, including:
 United States v. Zacarias Moussaoui, No. 01-455-A (E.D. Va.)
 United States v. Ahmed Omar Abu Ali
 United States v. John Walker Lindh, No. 02-37-A (E.D. Va.)
 Yaser Hamdi v. Donald Rumsfeld, No. 02-439 (E.D. Va.)
 United States v. Michael Vick, No. 3:07CR274 (E.D. Va) (the Bad Newz Kennels dogfighting case)
 eBay Inc. v. MercExchange, L.L.C., 271 F. Supp. 2d 789 (E.D. Va. 2002) (in which the court took the position, eventually upheld by the U.S. Supreme Court, that a prevailing plaintiff in a patent suit is not necessarily entitled to injunctive relief)
 Extradition of Kevin Dahlgren, charged with committing mass murder in Brno, Czech Republic in 2013
 Bostic v. Rainey
 Matter of Baby K, controversial ruling to provide life-sustaining care to an anencephalic newborn.
 United States v. Paul J. Manafort Jr.
 Chelsea Manning's contempt of court case
 United States v Daniel Hale
 United States v Javaid Perwaiz
 United States v. Randall Todd Royer, Ibrahim Ahmed Al-Hamdi, Masoud Ahmad Khan, Yong Ki Kwon, Mohammed Aatique, Seifullah Chapman, Donald Thomas Surratt, Caliph Basha Ibn Abdur-Raheem, Khwaja Mahmood Hasan, and Sabri Benkhala (E.D. Va., 2004)
 Cable News Network L.P. v. CNNews.com, 162 F.Supp.2d 484 (E.D. Va., 2001)

See also 
 Albert V. Bryan United States Courthouse
 Alexandria City Jail
 Courts of Virginia
 List of current United States district judges
 List of United States federal courthouses in Virginia

References

External links 
 United States District Court for the Eastern District of Virginia Official Website
 United States Attorney for the Eastern District of Virginia Official Website

Virginia, Eastern District
Virginia law
Alexandria, Virginia
Newport News, Virginia
Norfolk, Virginia
Organizations based in Richmond, Virginia
1819 establishments in Virginia
Courthouses in Virginia
Courts and tribunals established in 1819